Raghunatha is a given name. Notable people with the name include:

Raghunatha Bhatta Goswami (1505–1579), disciple of the Vaishnava saint Chaitanya Mahaprabhu
Raghunatha dasa Goswami, one of the principal disciples of the Vaishnava saint, Chaitanya Mahaprabhu
Raghunatha Kilavan, the Setupati (commander) of Ramnad district in southern Tamil Nadu, India between 1673 and 1708
Raghunatha Tirtha (died. 1502), Hindu philosopher and scholar; pontiff of Uttaradi Math of Dvaita Vedanta.
Raghunatha Siromani (1477–1547), Indian philosopher and logician
Raghunatha Tondaiman (1799–1839), the ruler of the princely state of Pudukkottai from 1825 to 1829
Rajakumar Vijaya Raghunatha Thondaiman, Indian politician and former Member of the Legislative Assembly of Tamil Nadu
Vijaya Raghunatha Raya Tondaiman II (1797–1825), the ruler of the princely state of Pudukkottai from 1807 to 1825
Vijaya Raghunatha Tondaiman (1759–1807), the ruler of the kingdom of Pudukkottai from 1789 to 1807